The Vignale Gamine is a small rear-engined car produced by Carrozzeria Vignale from 1967 until 1970, based on the Fiat 500, also known as Nuova 500.  Unlike the 500, however, the Gamine had an open-top Roadster structure and only two seats. Styling was by Alfredo Vignale. The Gamine is sometimes related in design to the Fiat 508 Balilla. A hard-top was offered at an extra cost, and is considered these days to be quite rare.

It was powered by a 2-cylinder, air-cooled engine of 499.5 cc from the Fiat 500 sport, the sporty version of the 500, and an engine later to be offered on the 500F.  There was only one engine version producing . A top speed of 97 km/h (60 mph) was claimed according to official data.

The Gamine never sold very well. In fact, the slow sales drove Carrozzeria Vignale out of business, forcing Alfredo Vignale to sell his production line to De Tomaso, which manufactured there the Pantera sports car.

External links 

 Vignale Gamine Homepage / International Gamine Register
 Fiat Gamine Register

Cars of Italy
Cars introduced in 1967
Rear-engined vehicles